Dapedium (from  , 'pavement') is an extinct genus of primitive neopterygian ray-finned fish. The first-described finding was an example of  D. politum, found in the Lower Lias of Lyme Regis, on the Jurassic Coast of England (Leach 1822). Dapedium lived in the late Triassic and Jurassic periods.

Appearance
The skin was covered with thick, rhomboid, ganoid (enamel-like) scales. The smallest species so far found is D. noricum.

The skull was armoured with bony dermal plates, which were especially plentiful in the orbital region. These bones bore irregular tubercles. The small pectoral and pelvic fins, along with the extended dorsal and anal fins formed a functional unit with the tail. The tail was short and stout, providing the power for a sudden change in direction while the fish was swimming.

The upper jaw of Dapedium was moveable and could protrude from the mouth, enabling a wider gape to capture larger prey.

Distribution

Dapedium lived mostly in the Jurassic seas of Europe,  a peripheral continental shelf sea of the Tethys Ocean. Notable finds have been made in Holzmaden, Germany, in Temple Grafton, Warwickshire, England and in Lyme Regis, Dorset, England.

Behaviour
The strong and pointed dentition suggests that Dapedium was durophagous, feeding on hard-shelled invertebrates, like mussels and sea urchins.

References

Detlev THIES & Annette HERZOG, New information on †Dapedium LEACH 1822 (Actinopterygii, †Semionotiformes), in Mesozoic Fishes 2 – Systematics and Fossil Record, G. Arratia & H.-P. Schultze (eds.): pp. 143-152, Verlag Dr. Friedrich Pfeil, München, Germany – 
 This article is based on a translation of an article from the German Wikipedia.

Dapediidae
Prehistoric ray-finned fish genera
Triassic bony fish
Jurassic bony fish
Mesozoic fish of Europe
Jurassic Germany
Fossils of Germany
Posidonia Shale
Fossil taxa described in 1822